Fred Flanagan (28 March 1924 – 14 January 2013) was an Australian rules footballer in the (then) Victorian Football League (VFL).

Flanagan was a gifted centre half-forward from Swan Hill who was a magnificent mark and kick. He played his whole career with Geelong Football Club.

In 1998 Flanagan was inducted into the Australian Football Hall of Fame.

Flanagan died on 14 January 2013, aged 88. In response to his death, the CEO of the Geelong Football Club, Brian Cook, said Flanagan "was a great man and a great Geelong man (...) [who] loved the club and the people that made up the club".

Career highlights 
Playing career:
 Geelong  1946–55 (Games: 163 Goals: 182)

Player honors:
 2nd Brownlow Medal 1950
 Geelong best and fairest 1949
 Geelong leading goalkicker 1954
 Geelong captain 1951–1953
 Geelong  premierships 1951 (captain), 1952 (captain)
 Geelong  Team of the Century
 Victorian representative 21 matches (21 games, 13 goals).

Footnotes

References

External links 
 AFL Hall of Fame

Geelong Football Club players
Geelong Football Club Premiership players
Geelong Football Club captains
Australian Football Hall of Fame inductees
Carji Greeves Medal winners
1924 births
2013 deaths
Australian rules footballers from Victoria (Australia)
People from Swan Hill
Two-time VFL/AFL Premiership players